Konec starých časů may refer to:

 Konec starých časů (novel), Czech novel by Vladislav Vančura
 The End of Old Times, 1989 film based on the novel